John Travers Cornwell VC (8 January 1900 – 2 June 1916), commonly known as Jack Cornwell or as Boy Cornwell, is remembered for his gallantry at the Battle of Jutland during World War I. Having died at the age of only 16, he was posthumously awarded the Victoria Cross, the highest award for gallantry in the face of the enemy that can be awarded to British and Commonwealth forces. Cornwell is the third-youngest recipient of the VC after Andrew Fitzgibbon and Thomas Flinn.

Early life
John "Jack" Travers Cornwell was born as the third child of a working-class family at Clyde Place, Leyton, Essex (now in Greater London). His parents were Eli and Lily Cornwell; he had a sister and three brothers, as well as two half-siblings from his father's previous marriage. The family later moved to Alverstone Road, East Ham. He left Walton Road School at the standard age of 14, but was in the Boy Scouts. At the outbreak of the First World War, ex-soldier Eli Cornwell volunteered for service and was fighting in France under Lord Kitchener. His older brother Arthur also served in an infantry regiment on the Western Front.

In October 1915, Jack Cornwell gave up his job as a delivery boy and enlisted in the Royal Navy without his father's permission. He had references from his headmaster and employer. He carried out his basic training at HMS Vivid Keyham Naval Barracks in Plymouth, and received further training as a Sight Setter or Gun Layer and became Boy Seaman First Class. On Easter Monday 1916, Cornwell left for Rosyth, Scotland, to join his assignment in the navy. He was assigned to HMS Chester.

Battle of Jutland

On 31 May 1916, Chester was scouting ahead of the 3rd Battlecruiser Squadron at the Battle of Jutland when the ship turned to investigate gunfire in the distance. At 17:30 hours, Chester soon came under intense fire from four Kaiserliche Marine cruisers each her own size which had suddenly emerged from the haze and increasing funnel smoke of the battlefield. The shielded 5.5-inch gun mounting where Cornwell was serving as a sight-setter was affected by at least four nearby hits. Chesters gun mountings were open-backed shields and did not reach down to the deck. Splinters were thus able to pass under them or enter the open back when shells exploded nearby or behind. All the gun's crew were killed or mortally injured except Cornwell, who, although severely wounded, managed to stand up again and remain at his post for more than 15 minutes, until Chester retired from the action with only one main gun still working. Chester had received a total of 18 hits, but partial hull armour meant that the interior of the ship suffered little serious damage and the ship itself was never in peril of sinking. Nevertheless, the situation on deck was dire. Many of the gun crews had lost lower limbs due to splinters passing under the gun shields. British ships reported passing the Chester to cheers from limbless wounded gun crew laid out on her deck and smoking cigarettes, only to hear that the same crewmen had died a few hours later from blood loss and shock.

After the action, medics arrived on deck to find Cornwell the sole survivor standing at his gun, shards of steel penetrating his chest, looking at the gun sights and still waiting for orders. Being incapable of further action, Chester was ordered to the port of Immingham. There Cornwell was transferred to Grimsby General Hospital, although he was clearly dying. He died shortly before 8:00am on the morning of 2 June 1916, before his mother could arrive at the hospital.

Victoria Cross
Three months later, Captain Robert Lawson of Chester described the events to the British Admiralty. Though at first reluctant, the Admiralty eventually decided to recommend Cornwell for a posthumous Victoria Cross and King George V endorsed it. The recommendation for citation, from Admiral David Beatty, reads: The instance of devotion to duty by Boy (1st Class) John Travers Cornwell who was mortally wounded early in the action, but nevertheless remained standing alone at a most exposed post, quietly awaiting orders till the end of the action, with the gun's crew dead and wounded around him. He was under 16½ years old. I regret that he has since died, but I recommend his case for special recognition in justice to his memory and as an acknowledgement of the high example set by him.

Jack Cornwell was initially buried in a common grave (Square 126 Grave 323) in Manor Park Cemetery, London, although his body was exhumed on 29 July 1916 at which he was reburied with full military honours in the same cemetery (square 55 grave 13). Cornwell's father Eli, who died on 25 October 1916 from bronchitis during home service with the Royal Defence Corps, was buried in the same grave on 31 October 1916. The epitaph to Jack Cornwell on his grave monument reads, 

In May 2016, the family grave and war memorial, erected in 1920, was given Grade II listed status, legally protecting it from unauthorised modification or removal.

The award of the Victoria Cross appeared in The London Gazette on Friday 15 September 1916. The citation read: The KING has been graciously pleased to approve the grant of the Victoria Cross to Boy, First Class, John Travers Cornwell, O.N.J.42563 (died 2 June 1916), for the conspicuous act of bravery specified below.

Mortally wounded early in the action, Boy, First Class, Jack Travers Cornwell remained standing alone at a most exposed post, quietly awaiting orders, until the end of the action, with the gun's crew dead and wounded all round him. His age was under sixteen and a half years.

On 16 November 1916, Cornwell's mother received the Victoria Cross from King George V at Buckingham Palace. Court painter Frank O. Salisbury made a portrait of Cornwell, using his brother Ernest as a model, depicting him standing in his post. Boy Cornwell Memorial Fund was also established. After that, the rest of the family was effectively forgotten. After Eli Cornwell's death on 25 October 1916, his half-brother Arthur Frederick Cornwell was killed in action in France on 29 August 1918. The impoverished Alice Cornwell died at the age of 48 on 31 October 1919, at 745 Commercial Road in Stepney, in rooms she was forced to take when her son's memorial fund refused financial aid. The two of her children remaining at home were granted £60 a year in a pension from the fund after Alice's death, but this proved insufficient and they both emigrated to Canada in the early 1920s. Jack Cornwell's elder half-sister, also named Alice, lent Jack's Victoria Cross to the Imperial War Museum on 27 November 1968. Salisbury's portrait of Cornwell hangs in the Anglican church within the Royal Navy's Initial Training Establishment HMS Raleigh.

Remembrance

The original furore caused by his very public re-burial led to over seven million of the Empire's children donating to his fund. £18,000 was raised in his memory for the Jack Cornwell ward of the Royal Star and Garter Home, Richmond. The John Cornwell Victoria Cross National Memorial (JCVCNM) was established in 1928, when a plot of land was purchased at Hornchurch, then in Essex, with money raised by the Mayor of East Ham. There, a community of cottage homes was built for needy, disabled or infirm former sailors and Royal Marines, up to and including the rank of Warrant Officer and their families. The six semi-detached houses and pathways are laid out in the form of a Victoria Cross. Since 2008, the community has been under the trusteeship of The Royal Naval Benevolent Trust.

Scouting

Sir Robert Baden-Powell, the founder of the Scout movement, created an award in his honour, The Cornwell Scout Badge, which is still used by Scout associations throughout the Commonwealth. It is awarded to youth members in respect of pre-eminently high character and devotion to duty, together with great courage and endurance. Camp Cornwell, established in 1925 as the headquarters for Western Australian Sea Scouts is situated at Pelican Point on the Swan River near Perth.

Cadets
Jack Cornwell is also remembered by the Sea Cadet Corps, Army Cadet Force and Air Training Corps, who each have a unit based in the UK's first and only Tri-Service Cadet building, named The Cornwell VC Cadet Centre, on Vicarage Lane in East Ham. Newham (Cornwell VC) Sea Cadets have been honoured with 'J T Cornwell VC' on their cap ribbon (Cap Tally) instead of the customary TS (training ship). They are the only Sea Cadet Unit in the UK to have this honour. In 2003, the Cadets suggested commemorating him by renaming a school in Leyton after him; when Cornwell attended the school it was known as Farmer Road School, and it is now named George Mitchell School, after another former pupil, George Allan Mitchell, who won a VC in Italy during the Second World War. Jack Cornwell is also remembered by Royal Navy Combined Cadet Force divisions, such as the RN CCF section at Whitgift School, Croydon, which is named the "Cornwell" division in his honour.

In Canada, Royal Canadian Sea Cadet Corps John Travers Cornwell, VC, based on HMCS Chippawa in Winnipeg, MB is named after him.

Other memorials
In Little Ilford, Jack Cornwell Street and a nearby block of council flats called John Cornwell VC House are named in his memory. In Jack Cornwell Street there is a public house named The Victoria Cross to commemorate his medal. A blue plaque has been erected by the London Borough of Waltham Forest on the flats that now occupy the site of his birthplace in Clyde Place, Leyton. The 5.5-inch gun on which he served is still displayed in the Imperial War Museum, London. In September 2006, Jack Cornwell VC featured on one of a series of Royal Mail postage stamps marking the 150th anniversary of the Victoria Cross. In 2016, Jack Cornwell was featured on a £5 coin (issued in silver and gold) in a six-coin set commemorating the Centenary of the First World War produced by the Royal Mint. Cornwell Close, on Grimsby's Nunsthorpe Estate and Cornwell Court in Haslemere Road, Portsmouth are named after him.

Citadel High School of Halifax, Nova Scotia gives out the Jack Cornwell Award to a student in each graduating class to the student who most exemplifies the qualities of honour, loyalty and bravery.

Mount Cornwell (2,972 metres) is a peak in the High Rock Range in British Columbia, part of the Canadian Rockies, which was named in his honour in 1918. There is also a Mount Chester (3,054 metres) in Alberta, named after HMS Chester in 1917.

See also
My Boy Jack (poem)

References

External links

 Boy (1st Class) John ‘Jack’ Travers Cornwell VC - illustrated article from the Imperial War Museum
 John Travers Cornwell (biography)
 Location of grave and VC medal (E. London)
 .
 Photographs and items related to Jack Cornwell in the Imperial War Museums' collections
 Frank O. Salisbury's portrait of Cornwell
 

British World War I recipients of the Victoria Cross
Royal Navy sailors
Military personnel from Essex
Royal Navy personnel of World War I
British military personnel killed in World War I
1900 births
1916 deaths
The Scout Association
People associated with Scouting
People from Leyton
Royal Navy recipients of the Victoria Cross
People from Manor Park, London
Child soldiers in World War I